Richard Alan Rose (born 8 September 1982) is an English professional footballer who plays for Hastings United. Rose plays as a defender and has been noted for his versatility having played in both the full back and centre back positions, and occasionally in central midfield.

Playing career
Rose was born in Tonbridge, Kent and joined Gillingham as a youth player. Whilst still a trainee he made his professional debut as a 14th minute substitute in Gillingham's 2–1 defeat at Crewe Alexandra on 16 April 2001. Rose went on to play in the final four games of the season in place of the injured Mark Patterson. He made only a handful of Division One appearances for the Gills in the following two seasons, but had a 9 match spell on loan at then Division Three side Bristol Rovers during the 2002–03 season. He was reported to have done well whilst with the Pirates, receiving glowing reports from manager Ray Graydon.

Rose started to establish himself more in the 2004–05 season, during which time he played 20 times (18 in the league), mostly at right or left back. Gillingham were eventually relegated back down to League One at the end of that season. Relegation prompted the departures of Nyron Nosworthy (a right back) and John Hills (a left back), presenting Rose to stake a claim for a regular spot in the starting line-up in League One. Things certainly started according to plan as Neale Cooper gave Rose a permanent right-back spot. With Cooper's departure midway through the season, Rose was out of favour under new manager Ronnie Jepson and only made one more appearance for the first team. He was released on 9 May 2006.

Rose soon found a new home at newly promoted Hereford United where he played initially in centre midfield. He started 15 out of the first 16 matches of the season in League Two and scored his first senior goal in a 2–0 home win over Chester. He was then dropped in favour of loan signings John Eustace and Neil MacKenzie. When he returned to the side he reverted to the defence where he finished the season as third choice centre back.

Rose was used mainly as a full-back during the 2007–08 season and scored the second goal of his career in a superb 5–1 victory over Darlington. He was a regular starter for the Bulls in their promotion-winning season, but was sidelined for six weeks mid-season with a fractured ankle. Rose started 17 of the final 20 league matches of the season as Hereford finished third in League Two.

In August 2011 Rose signed for Dagenham & Redbridge.

In October 2013 Rose signed on a two-month loan at Maidstone United from Conference South side Whitehawk.

In June 2014 he signed for Hastings United FC of the Ryman League South

Personal life
Richard is a cousin of former EastEnders actor Ricky Groves. He enjoys board games, and is ranked in the world's top 50 for Hasbro's strategic classic 'Risk'.
Richard was voted number 26 in FHM's hottest men in 2009.

Career statistics

Honours
Hereford United
 League Two: third place, 2007–08

References

External links
Official Hereford United Profile

1982 births
Living people
People from Tonbridge
English footballers
Gillingham F.C. players
Longford Town F.C. players
Bristol Rovers F.C. players
Hereford United F.C. players
Dagenham & Redbridge F.C. players
Dartford F.C. players
Whitehawk F.C. players
Maidstone United F.C. players
Hastings United F.C. players
English Football League players
National League (English football) players
Isthmian League players
League of Ireland players
Association football defenders
Association football midfielders
Expatriate association footballers in the Republic of Ireland